The following Confederate States Army units and commanders fought in the siege of Petersburg of the American Civil War. The following order of battle is the organization from the Confederate forces near Petersburg of October 27, 1864.

Abbreviations used

Military rank
 Gen = General
 LTG = Lieutenant General
 MG = Major General
 BG = Brigadier General
 Col = Colonel
 Ltc = Lieutenant Colonel
 Maj = Major
 Cpt = Captain
 Lt = Lieutenant

Other
 w = wounded
 mw = mortally wounded
 k = killed

Confederate forces near Petersburg
Gen Robert E. Lee

Army of Northern Virginia

Gen Robert E. Lee

Provost Guard: Maj. David B. Bridgford
5th Alabama Battalion
1st Virginia Battalion
48th Georgia (1 company)
39th Virginia Cavalry Battalion
Engineers: MG Jeremy Francis Gilmer
1st Confederate Engineers
2nd Confederate Engineers

First Corps
LTG James Longstreet

Third Corps
LTG A. P. Hill

Fourth Corps
LTG Richard H. Anderson

Cavalry Corps
MG Wade Hampton III

Department of Richmond
LTG Richard S. Ewell

Richmond forces
MG James L. Kemper

Post of Richmond
BG William M. Gardner

Department of North Carolina and Southern Virginia
Gen Pierre Gustave Toutant Beauregard

References
http://www.brettschulte.net/CWBlog/regimental-level-orders-of-battle/

American Civil War orders of battle